The Langara Point Lighthouse is a manned lighthouse located atop a scenic bluff on the northwest corner of Langara Island.  It is one of only two lighthouses in Haida Gwaii – the other being at Cape St. James (now an automated station), at the southern tip of the islands. Both were built in 1913.

During World War II, the lighthouse was painted camouflage green and a radar station was built here to monitor the North Pacific.

The original light, still in use today, is a first-order Fresnel lens (the largest type of lighthouse lens) manufactured by Chance Brothers of England.  Each side of the lens is over 8’ tall and 5’ wide with a focal length of 3’

The lighthouse is easily seen from the water and tours are possible via helicopter.  Guests to Langara Island can enjoy a 1-2 hour tour of the lighthouse and its surrounding grounds, usually including a trip up to the top of the light tower, as well as coffee or tea with the lightkeepers.

The Langara Light is one of 12 lighthouses part of the British Columbia Shore Station Oceanographic Program, collecting coastal water temperature and salinity measurements everyday since 1936.

Keepers
 Head Keepers: James T. Forsyth 1913–1918
 William J. Stinson 1918–1919
 J. McCann 1919
 George Armstrong 1919–1932 
 H. Greenwood 1932–1936
 Gordon Odlum 1941–1942
 William Norman Kinnear 1943–1945
 Neil Lange 1945–1947
 Richard Crawford 1948–1950
 Otto Lindstrom 1950–1953
 George Brown 1953–1957
 Edward Albert Hartt 1957–1963
 Wilf Redlac 1963–1964
 Maurice Collette 1967–1971
 Ken Wallace 1971–1973
 Tom E. Carr 1973–1975
 Charles Redhead 1975–1982
 Edward J. Ashe 1982–1983
 Kenneth Brunn 1983–1989
 Warren Kennedy 1989–1992
 Gordon Schweers 1992–2010
 Stanley Westhaver 2010–present

See also
 List of lighthouses in British Columbia
 List of lighthouses in Canada
 Henri de Miffonis

References

External links
 Aids to Navigation Canadian Coast Guard
 Picture of Langara Point Lighthouse

Lighthouses completed in 1913
Lighthouses in British Columbia
Heritage sites in British Columbia
1913 establishments in British Columbia
Lighthouses on the Canadian Register of Historic Places